W. G. Grace played in 31 matches in the 1895 English cricket season, 29 of which are recognised as first-class.

Background
Against all expectation, Grace produced in 1895 a season that has been called his "Indian Summer".  He completed his hundredth century playing for Gloucestershire against Somerset in May. Charles Townsend, his batting partner when he reached the milestone, said that as he approached his hundred: "This was the one and only time I ever saw him flustered..." Eventually Sammy Woods bowled a full toss which Grace drove for four to reach his century. He then went on to score 1,000 runs in the month, the first time this had ever been done, with scores of 13, 103, 18, 25, 288, 52, 257, 73 not out, 18 and 169 totalling 1,016 runs between 9 and 30 May.  His aggregate for the whole season was 2,346 at an average of 51.00 with nine centuries. He was aged forty-seven at the start of the season and forty-eight by its end.

Grace made 29 first-class appearances in 1895, scoring 2,346 runs, with a highest score of 288, at an average of 51.00 with 9 centuries and 5 half-centuries. In the field, he took 31 catches and 16 wickets with a best analysis of 5–87. His bowling average was 32.93; he had 5 wickets in an innings once.

Following his "Indian Summer", Grace was the sole recipient of the Wisden Cricketers of the Year award for 1896, the first of only three times that Wisden has restricted the award to a single player, there being normally five recipients.

Footnote

• a) As described in Grace's first-class career statistics, there are different versions of Grace's first-class career totals as a result of disagreement among cricket statisticians re the status of some matches he played in.  Note that this is a statistical issue only and has little, if any, bearing on the historical aspects of Grace's career. In the infobox, the "traditional" first-class figures from Wisden 1916 (as reproduced by Rae, pp. 495–496), are given first and the "amended" figures from CricketArchive follow in parentheses. There is no dispute about Grace's Test career record and those statistics are universally recognised. See Variations in first-class cricket statistics for more information.

References

Bibliography

External links
 CricketArchive – W.G. Grace

1895 in English cricket
English cricket seasons in the 19th century
1895